Frentorish "Tori" Bowie (born August 27, 1990) is an American track and field athlete, who primarily competes in the 100 m and the 200 m. She is the 2017 100m world champion, a 2016 Olympian and a three-time Olympic medalist.

Bowie competed collegiately for the University of Southern Mississippi and was a two-time NCAA long jump champion, winning indoors and outdoors in 2011. She holds the school records for the long jump and was also NCAA runner-up outdoors in 2012. She came runner-up in the long jump at the 2014 USA Indoor Track and Field Championships and represented her country at the 2014 IAAF World Indoor Championships.

After winning Diamond League races in Eugene, Rome, New York, and Monaco in 2014, Bowie shifted her focus to the sprints beginning in 2015.

Biography

Early life and college
Born in Sand Hill, Rankin County, Mississippi, she attended Pisgah High School and began competing in track for the school. She won two state high school championships in the 100 m dash, 200 m dash and the long jump, as well as three state titles in the 4×100 m relay. She also competed on the state team in women's basketball. Bowie gained an athletic scholarship to attend the University of Southern Mississippi, doing an interdisciplinary degree. She represented the Southern Miss Golden Eagles and Lady Eagles in NCAA Division I competitions. Doing both sprints and jumps, she had her best results in the long jump during her freshman year, coming third at the Conference USA indoors, second at the Conference USA outdoors and reaching the NCAA Women's Outdoor Track and Field Championship, where she jumped in qualifying only.

At the outdoor Conference USA meet, she came third in the long jump and also made the 100 m final. She also jumped nationally at the 2010 USA Outdoor Track and Field Championships, managing eighth place overall.

The 2011 season saw her rise to the top of the rankings. She began with a long jump victory at the Conference USA indoors, where she was also runner-up in the triple jump. For her achievements she was named the conference female athlete of the year.

She also managed second place in the long jump. Bowie competed in both jumps at the NCAA indoor championship, but was out of the top eight in both events. Outdoors, she significantly improved her 100 m best that year, dropping from 11.76 to 11.28 seconds. In her last major outing for the Southern Miss Eagles she tried to defend her NCAA outdoor title in the long jump, but was beaten by Whitney Gipson and finished second.

Professional
Bowie began competing in track and field professionally in 2013. At the 2013 USA Outdoor Track and Field Championships she was a 100 m semi-finalist and narrowly missed the long jump team for the 2013 World Championships in Athletics after finishing fourth in that event. She also competed on the IAAF Diamond League circuit for the first time, long jumping at the Adidas Grand Prix and Herculis meets.

She continued to improve at the start of 2014, setting indoor bests of 7.14 seconds for the 60 m dash and clearing  for the long jump in Naperville, Illinois. After a win at the New Balance Indoor Grand Prix, her runner-up finish in the long jump at the USA Indoor Track and Field Championships gained Bowie a spot on team for the 2014 IAAF World Indoor Championships. Unfortunately, she faltered in the qualifying and was eliminated, coming 14th overall.

In June 2014, she set two new personal records in the 100 m dash & 200 m dash events at the IAAF Diamond League Championship. She competed in the Adidas Grand Prix event in Randall's Island, New York. Bowie placed first in the BMW Women’s 100 m race with a time of 11.07 seconds.
She ran a 10.91, netting her the top time in the semifinal at the 2014 USA Outdoor Track and Field Championships.

Bowie won with a 10.81 time at the 2015 USA Outdoor Track and Field Championships to earn a spot in the women's 100 meter heats at the 2015 World Championships in Athletics, where she went on to earn a bronze medal.

Bowie placed third in the 100 m by running a 10.779 at the 2016 United States Olympic Trials (track and field).

At the 2016 Summer Olympics in Rio, Bowie won the silver medal in the 100 meter dash with a time of 10.83s. She then won the bronze medal in the 200 meter dash with a time of 22.15s. She also won a gold medal as a member of the 4×100 m relay team.

At the 2017 World Athletics Championships in London, Bowie won the gold medal in the 100 meter dash, winning in a time of 10.85 seconds, with a .01 second margin of victory.

At the 2019 BYU Robison Invitational on Clarence Robison Track at Brigham Young University, Bowie jumped the entry standard for 2019 World Championships  on April 27, 2019.

Personal records
Outdoor
100 meter dash – 10.78 (2016)
200 meter dash – 21.77 (2017)
Long jump –  (2013)
Triple jump –  (2012)

Indoor
60 meter dash – 7.14 (2014)
Long jump –  (2014)
Triple jump –  (2012)

Competition record

1Did not start in the semifinals
Long jump titles
NCAA Women's Indoor Championships: 2011
NCAA Women's Outdoor Championships: 2011

References

External links

Living people
1990 births
American female long jumpers
American female sprinters
American female triple jumpers
African-American female track and field athletes
Southern Miss Golden Eagles and Lady Eagles athletes
University of Southern Mississippi alumni
People from Rankin County, Mississippi
World Athletics Championships athletes for the United States
World Athletics Championships medalists
Athletes (track and field) at the 2016 Summer Olympics
Olympic gold medalists for the United States in track and field
Olympic silver medalists for the United States in track and field
Olympic bronze medalists for the United States in track and field
Medalists at the 2016 Summer Olympics
Track and field athletes from Mississippi
World Athletics Championships winners
USA Outdoor Track and Field Championships winners
21st-century African-American sportspeople
21st-century African-American women